Ladewig is a German language surname. It stems from the male given name Ludwig – and may refer to:
Marion Ladewig (1914–2010), American ten-pin bowler
Wilhelm Ladewig (1906–1979), German athlete

References

See also 
Ladwig

German-language surnames
Surnames from given names